The Charlotte Eagles is an American professional soccer team based in Charlotte, North Carolina, United States. Founded in 1991, the team plays in USL League Two, the fourth tier of the American Soccer Pyramid.

The team plays its home games at the Sportsplex at Matthews. The team's colors are orange, white and blue.

History

Founded in 1991 as the Charlotte Eagles Soccer Club, the team turned professional when it entered the USISL in 1993.  The Eagles enjoyed a brief spell in the A-League before financial troubles caused them to return to the lower level.

The Eagles are a division of Missionary Athletes International (MAI), an organization which undertakes sports ministry to share the message of Christianity through the environment of soccer. They are a sister organisation of the USL League Two side Southern California Seahorses, and also field a women's team – the Charlotte Lady Eagles – in the Women's Premier Soccer League.

Back to the PDL
In 2016 The Charlotte Eagles were profiled by Britain's The Guardian newspaper. The piece highlighted the team's policy of discrimination against openly gay and bisexual players.

Stadiums

Media
The Eagles receive written coverage from Charlotte's major daily newspaper The Charlotte Observer. Highlights are often shown on local news broadcasts.  All games are shown live on the Charlotte Eagles official YouTube page.  Harrison Raby is the play-by-play voice for home broadcasts.

Players and staff

Staff

  David Urban – president
  Cliff Wright – executive director
  Michael Kovach – head coach
  Drew Yates – assistant coach

Notable former players

Head coaches
  Brian Davidson (1993–1996)
  Mark Steffens (1997–2014)
  Dave Dixon (2014–2017)
  Luke Helmuth (2017–2018)
  Garrett Bireline (2018-2020)
  Michael Kovach (2020–present)

Achievements

USISL Pro League
 South Atlantic Division Champions: 1996
USL D-3 Pro League
 Champions: 2000
 Atlantic Division Champions: 1999
USL Pro Soccer League
 Southern Division Champions: 2004
USL Second Division
 Champions: 2005
 Regular Season Champions: 2008
USL PRO
 Championship Finalist: 2013
Premier Development League
 Champions: 2017
 Eastern Conference Champions: 2017
 South Atlantic Division Champions: (2) 2015, 2016
Hank Steinbrecher Cup
 Runner-up: 2018
Southern Derby
 Champions: (4) 2001, 2012, 2013, 2014

Record

Year-by-year

References

External links
 

 
Association football clubs established in 1991
Soccer clubs in North Carolina
Former USL Championship teams
Former USL Second Division teams
A-League (1995–2004) teams
USISL teams
1991 establishments in North Carolina
USL League Two teams
Christian sports organizations